Jorge Velasco Navarro (born 1971) is a Spanish painter born in Madrid. He is the son of Teresa Navarro Valero, designer and founder of the textile brand in 1955 with the same name and father Francisco Velasco Rodriguez, also a businessman, painter and writer.

Exhibitions  

 1989 Living Gardens, City of Madrid
 1991 Oil paintings, Jorge Velasco Navarro, exhibit entitled Contrasts in the Exhibition Hall of the Cultural Center José de Espronceda, in Almansa, Madrid
 1993 Exhibition of paintings and sculptures by the brothers J. Velasco, Exhibition Hall of the Cultural Center San Juan Bautista, San Nemesio, S / N. Madrid.
 1993 Exhibition of Contemporary Painting J. Velasco, Tetuan Cultural Center. C / Bravo Murillo, 251, Madrid.
 1993 Jorge Velasco Navarro exhibition at the Cultural Center “El Torito”. Avda. De Moratalaz, S / N. Madrid.
 1993 Contrmporánea and Painting Exhibition “Collages” by the brothers Jorge Velasco Navarro and Josechu Velasco Navarro, the Bohemians 1 Cultural Center, Madrid
 1993 Exhibition: Artists of the Future (Art Collage) J. Velasco Brothers in the Huerta de la Salud I Cultural Center, C / Mar de las Antillas, S / N. Madrid.
 1994 Sculpture “Female Silhouette” sold at art auctions, Duran House, Calle Serrano 12-1 ^, Madrid
 1995-2008 Exposed outside Spain, among the most important exhibitions of the artist Jorge Velasco Navarro, include Miami (Florida) USA and Florence Italy
 2009 Exhibition Jorge Velasco Navarro, in Excellence Fair, at the Castle of Peralada, Carrer Sant Antoni, 0, 17491 Peralada, Girona
 2010 Exposition Jorge Velasco Navarro, Buddha Hall, Ctra. De La Coruna, Km8,700, 28023 Madrid
 2010 Exhibition entitled “Verso Est” Jorge Velasco Navarro, in Artebar La Latina, C / S. Bruno 3 Madrid.
 2011 Exhibition entitled: Flash of Genius (Destellos de Genio), Exhibition Hall of the District of Retiro, Av Ciudad de Barcelona. 162, Madrid.

Works 

Among his best known works are:

 1989 Christ,
 1990 The Suit
 1991 The Warrior
 1992 Shoes Bonito
 1993 Lady with Dog
 1995 El Asadero
 1996 La Carbonera
 1998 Dragonflies
 2000 Cascorro
 2001 Windmills
 2005 Broom
 2006 Volumes
 2007 Ojos de Torro
 2009 Volumes and Lands
 2011 Depression, Menina
 2012-2013 Cubist Portraits
 2014-2015 Between Mirrors, Inspiration

Reference List

External links 
 Official website of the artist
 An article on Jorge Velasco Navarro

Spanish painters
1971 births
Living people
21st-century Spanish painters
Spanish male painters
People from Madrid
21st-century Spanish male artists